The morning glory disc anomaly (MGDA) is a congenital deformity resulting from failure of the optic nerve to completely form in utero. The term was coined in 1970 by Kindler, noting a resemblance of the malformed optic nerve to the morning glory flower. The condition is usually unilateral.

Presentation

Complications
Serous retinal detachment can occur in the affected eye.

Associated conditions
Although the finding itself is rare, MGDA can be associated with midline cranial defects and abnormal carotid circulation, such as carotid stenosis/aplasia or progressive vascular obstruction with collateralization (also known as moyamoya disease). The vascular defects may lead to ischemia, stroke, or seizures and so a finding of MGDA should be further investigated with radiographic imaging.

Diagnosis
On fundoscopic examination, there are three principal findings comprising the anomaly:
an enlarged, funnel-shaped excavation in optic disc
an annulus or ring of  pigmentary changes surrounding the optic disc excavation
a central glial tuft overlying the optic disc

See also
 Coloboma of optic nerve

References

Optic nerve
Disorders of optic nerve and visual pathways